Standard Media Group is an American broadcast and digital media company based in Nashville, Tennessee. Standard Media was founded by Deborah A. McDermott, who serves as the company's CEO.  Previously, McDermott was the chief operating officer of Media General and CEO-president of Young Broadcasting. Between 2012 and 2017, McDermott and her team led the acquisition of more than 90 television stations and helped grow Young/Media General from a $220 million regional TV group to a nearly $5 billion media company. In 2017, Media General was acquired by Nexstar Broadcasting Group for $4.6 billion.

On May 16, 2019, Standard Media announced plans to purchase two ABC-affiliated television stations from Citadel Communications for $83 million.  The stations, WLNE-TV in Providence, Rhode Island and KLKN in Lincoln, Nebraska, have been operated by Citadel since 2011 and 1996 respectively.  The company announced the acquisition of Waypoint Media and its affiliated companies in November 2019. The Waypoint deal collapsed in January 2021.

In November 2020, Sinclair Broadcast Group announced that they would sell Fox affiliate KBSI and MyNetworkTV affiliate WDKA in Paducah, Kentucky, to Community News Media (a subsidiary of Standard Media) for $28 million, in a transaction that closed in 2021.

On February 22, 2022, a partnership of Standard General and Apollo announced their intent to acquire Tegna; Apollo will hold non-voting shares in the company. As part of the sale, Standard General will sell Standard Media to Cox Media Group, which will also acquire Tegna's stations in Dallas–Fort Worth, Houston, and Austin (including WFAA, KHOU, and KVUE). WFXT in Boston will then be divested to Standard General. The sale was approved by Standard General and Apollo Global Management on May 17, 2022.

Stations

References

External links
Official website
KBSI Website
WDKA Website
WLNE Website
KLKN Website

Television broadcasting companies of the United States
Companies based in Nashville, Tennessee
Mass media companies established in 2018
Announced mergers and acquisitions